Fulton Heights Historic District is a national historic district located at Salisbury, Rowan County, North Carolina.  The district encompasses 439 contributing buildings and 2 contributing structures in predominantly residential section of Salisbury.  It largely developed between about 1903 and 1948, and includes notable examples of Colonial Revival and Bungalow / American Craftsman style architecture. Notable buildings include the T.A. Ludwick House, Choate-Blount House, Lauriston Hardin House, Williams-Kesler House, Lewis D. Peeler House, F.W. Kirk House, Second Reformed Presbyterian Church (1913), First Associate Reformed Presbyterian Church (1939), Calvin H. Wiley School (1916), R. L. Foil and Company Grocery (1905), the Albright Cash Store, and the Piggly Wiggly Grocery.

It was listed on the National Register of Historic Places in 1999.

References

Historic districts on the National Register of Historic Places in North Carolina
Colonial Revival architecture in North Carolina
Buildings and structures in Rowan County, North Carolina
National Register of Historic Places in Rowan County, North Carolina